Zapateado may refer to:

Zapateado (Spain), traditional dance and music of Spain
Zapateado, a work for violin and piano by Pablo de Sarasate, part of the Spanish Dances, Op. 23
Zapateado (Mexico), traditional dances of Mexico